, provisional designation , is a trans-Neptunian object on a highly eccentric orbit in the scattered disc region at the edge of Solar System.  Approximately  in diameter, it was discovered on 3 October 2007 by astronomers Andrew Becker, Andrew Puckett and Jeremy Kubica during the Sloan Digital Sky Survey at Apache Point Observatory in New Mexico, United States. According to American astronomer Michael Brown, the bluish object is "possibly" a dwarf planet. It belongs to a group of objects studied in 2014, which lead to the proposition of the hypothetical Planet Nine.

Orbit and classification 

 orbits the Sun at a distance of 35.5–910 AU once every 10279 years and 9 months (3,754,688 days; semi-major axis of 473 AU). Its orbit has an exceptionally high eccentricity of 0.92 and an inclination of 19° with respect to the ecliptic.

 is an extended scattered disc object, as its large aphelion distance is similar to that of the detached objects such as the sednoids (e.g. 90377 Sedna), its perihelion distance, however, is much lower and still just inside the gravitational influence of Neptune. The object came to perihelion in 2005 at a heliocentric distance of 35.5 AU, and is currently 37.9 AU from the Sun. It was in the constellation of Taurus until 2018, and came to opposition 29 November 2017. The body's observation arc begins at Apache Point in September 2007, one month prior to its official discovery observation. It has since been observed over a hundred times and has an orbital uncertainty of 1.

Unstable heliocentric solutions 

Given the orbital eccentricity of this object, different epochs can generate quite different heliocentric unperturbed two-body best-fit solutions to the aphelion (maximum distance from the Sun) of this object. With a 2007 epoch the object had an approximate period of about 10,611 years with aphelion at 930 AU. But using a 2012 epoch shows a period of about 13,512 years with aphelion at 1099 AU. For objects at such high eccentricity, the Sun's barycentric coordinates are more stable than heliocentric coordinates. Using JPL Horizons with an observed orbital arc of 5 years, the barycentric orbital elements for epoch 2008-May-14 generate a semi-major axis of 503 AU and a period of 11,300 years. For comparison, Sedna has a barycentric semi-major axis of 506 AU and a period of 11,400 years.

Numbering and naming 

This minor planet was numbered by the Minor Planet Center on 25 September 2018. As of 2018, it has not been named.

Physical characteristics 

 is expected to have a low albedo (see below) due to its blue (neutral) color.

Diameter and albedo 

According to the Johnston's archive and to Michael Brown,  measures 222 and 331 kilometers in diameter, based on an absolute magnitude of 6.5 and an assumed standard albedo of 0.09 and 0.04 for the body's surface, respectively. As of 2018, no rotational lightcurve has been obtained from photometric observations. The body's rotation period, pole and shape remain unknown. Michael Brown's website lists it as a possible dwarf planet.

Comparison

Notes

References

External links 
 Discovery Circumstances: Numbered Minor Planets (520001)–(525000) Minor Planet Center
 
 

523622
523622
Discoveries by Andrew C. Becker
Discoveries by Andrew W. Puckett
Discoveries by Jeremy Martin Kubica
20071003